The  is an all-stations train service in Japan operated by the East Japan Railway Company (JR East) in Tokyo between  on the Chuo Line or  on the Musashino Line and  in Saitama Prefecture. This train only operates a few services in the morning and evening peaks each day. Shimōsa is a similar service linking Ōmiya and the eastern side of the Musashino Line. The trains from  travel on the Chuo Line. After Kunitachi station, trains will go through a cargo branch. After stopping at Shin-Kodaira, the train uses the Musashino Line. After Kita-Asaka station, the train goes by special freight non-stop tracks. After passing Nishi-Urawa station, the train turns to  arriving trucks. Trains usually stop on Platforms 3 and 4 at  station.

Service pattern

In the evening, there are two services from Ōmiya to Hachiōji, and one service from Hachiōji to Ōmiya.

Weekdays

To Ōmiya
  (0735) →  (0815)
 Fuchū-Hommachi (0807) → Ōmiya (0844)
  (1655) →  Ōmiya (1745)
 Hachiōji (1844) →  Ōmiya (1943)

To Hachiōji 
 Ōmiya (0849) →  Hachiōji (0944)
 Ōmiya (1847) →  Hachiōji (1947)
 Ōmiya (2031) →  Hachiōji (2125)

Weekends/holidays

To Ōmiya
 Hachiōji (0719) → Omiya (0812)
 Fuchū-Hommachi (0826) → Ōmiya (0904)
 Hachiōji (0950) → Ōmiya (1040)
 Hachiōji (1656) → Ōmiya (1745)
 Hachiōji (1747) → Ōmiya (1836)

To Hachiōji 
 Ōmiya (0853) →  Hachiōji (0945)
 Ōmiya (1822) →  Hachiōji (1916)
 Ōmiya (1952) →  Hachiōji (2043)

Routes
The trains to and from Hachiōji use two of the Musashino Line freight branches: one connects the Chūō Main Line (Kunitachi Station) and the Musashino Line (Shin-Kodaira Station) and the other connects the Musashino Line (Nishi-Urawa Station) and the Tōhoku Main Line (Yono Station).

Rolling stock
Current rolling stock:Services share rolling stock with the Musashino Line and are currently operated by E231-0 series, or E231-900 series 8-car EMUs with longitudinal seating throughout.

Former rolling stock:

Former rolling stock was 8-car 205 series, 6-car 115 series and 6-car 169 series

History

The Musashino was formed in 2001 following the renaming of the earlier Rapid Shinkansen Relay. From 1 December 2002, 6-car 115 series EMU formations based at Toyoda depot in Tokyo replaced the previous 165 and 169 series EMU formations.

Rapid service pattern
Prior to the 4 December 2010 timetable revision, two return workings operated on weekdays, with one return Holiday Rapid Musashino working at weekends, as shown below.

Weekdays
 Musashino 1:  (07:35) →  (08:15)
 Musashino 2: Ōmiya (08:49) →   (09:44)
 Musashino 3: Hachiōji (16:55) → Ōmiya (17:45)
 Musashino 4: Ōmiya (18:47) →  Hachiōji (19:47)

Weekends/holidays
 Musashino: Hachiōji (07.19) → Ōmiya (08.12)
Musashino: Hachiōji (09.53) → Ōmiya (10.40)
Musashino: Hachiōji (16.56) → Ōmiya (17.45)
Musashino: Hachiōji (17.47) → Ōmiya (18.36)
Musashino: Ōmiya (08.53) →  Hachiōji (09.45)
Musashino: Ōmiya (18.22) →  Hachiōji (19.16)
Musashino: Ōmiya (19.52) →  Hachiōji (20.43)

From the start of the revised timetable on 4 December 2010, the Musashino ceased to be a limited-stop "rapid" service, with trains stopping at all stations, and the number of daily services increased.

See also
 List of named passenger trains of Japan
Musashino Line
Shimōsa (train), a similar service linking Ōmiya and the eastern side of the Musashino Line and also the Keiyō Line.

References

Named passenger trains of Japan
East Japan Railway Company
Railway services introduced in 2001
2001 establishments in Japan